Ariel Kallner (born 5 July 1980) is an Israeli politician. He served as a member of the Knesset for Likud between 2020 and 2021.

Biography
Kallner was born into a secular family in Haifa, the oldest of three brothers, and attended the Hebrew Reali School. His national service in the Israel Defense Forces saw him serve as a combat medic in the Golani Brigade, during which time he became religious. He subsequently attended the Technion and earned an MBA at the University of Haifa.
 
Whilst at the Technion, he established the anti-disengagement movement known as the orange cell, and was elected chair of the Likud Youth Movement in 2004. Prior to the April 2019 elections he was placed thirty-fourth on the Likud list, and was elected to the Knesset as the party won 35 seats. However, he lost his seat in the early elections in September the same year as Likud were reduced to 31 seats. He failed to regain his seat in the 2020 elections, but re-entered the Knesset on 5 July as a replacement for Tzipi Hotovely after she resigned her seat under the Norwegian Law following her appointment to the cabinet. Placed thirty-third on the Likud list for the March 2021 elections, he lost his seat as Likud was reduced to 30 seats.

Kallner is married with four children and lives in Haifa.

References

External links

1980 births
Living people
Jewish Israeli politicians
Likud politicians
Members of the 21st Knesset (2019)
Members of the 23rd Knesset (2020–2021)
People from Haifa
Technion – Israel Institute of Technology alumni
University of Haifa alumni